EADA can refer to:

English amateur dancesport association ltd	 
Executive Assistant District Attorney	
EADA Business School